The SPAD S.42 was a French biplane trainer aircraft of the early 1920s, developed by Société Pour L'Aviation et ses Dérivés (SPAD) from prolific SPAD S.XIII fighter.

Specifications

References

Bibliography

S.42
Aircraft first flown in 1921
Biplanes
Single-engined tractor aircraft